{{DISPLAYTITLE:C15H21NO4}}
The molecular formula C15H21NO4 (molar mass: 279.33 g/mol, exact mass: 279.1471 u) may refer to:

 Afurolol
 Metalaxyl

Molecular formulas